Holywell is a small village near Belcoo in County Fermanagh, Northern Ireland. It is within the townlands of Cavancarragh and Rushin. It had a population (with Belcoo) of 486 in the 2001 Census. It is part of the Fermanagh and Omagh area.

See also 
 List of towns and villages in Northern Ireland

References 

 NI Neighbourhood Information Service
 Fermanagh Gold
 Culture Northern Ireland
 Holy Well page of Clogher Historical Society/Cumann Seanchais Chlochair website - includes current pilgrimage and contact details

Villages in County Fermanagh
Fermanagh and Omagh district